Mangelia andamanensis is a species of sea snail, a marine gastropod mollusk in the family Mangeliidae.

Description
The length of the shell attains 6 mm, its diameter 2 mm.

(Original description) The slenderly fusiform shell is pale yellowish brown, blotched here and there with light chestnut. It contains 7 whorls, convex, angled above. The first two are horny, the later whorls sculptured with transverse ridges and fine spiral striae, presenting a finely cancellate appearance. The sutures are deeply impressed. The aperture is oval. The outer lip is varicosely thickened. The sinus is broad but not deep.

Distribution
This marine species occurs off the Andaman Islands

References

External links

andamanensis
Gastropods described in 1908